William Semple Brown Wallace (born 23 June 1940) is a Scottish former football player and coach. He won the European Cup with Celtic in 1967 along with several domestic honours. His other clubs included Stenhousemuir, Raith Rovers, Heart of Midlothian and Dumbarton in the Scottish leagues, and Crystal Palace in English football.

Wallace played for Scotland seven times and was inducted into the national Hall of Fame in 2017 for his club achievements.

Club career

Early career
He started his senior playing career with Stenhousemuir as a teenager in 1958 (having played alongside Jim Storrie at Kilsyth Rangers), moving to Raith Rovers a year later. It was in Kirkcaldy that "Wispy", as Wallace was nicknamed, developed his reputation as a top-class goal poacher, his skills being rewarded with a first Scottish League cap.

Hearts
Wallace's form attracted attention from larger clubs, Heart of Midlothian eventually spending £15,000 to take him to Edinburgh in April 1961. The increased pressure for success at Tynecastle initially curtailed his scoring exploits, for he was expected to replace no less a figure than Alex Young, the "Golden Vision", whom Hearts had sold to Everton a couple of months earlier. By season 1962–63, however, Wallace was fully settled into the tactics of manager Tommy Walker, and he would become Hearts' top scorer for the next four seasons through to 1965–66. In doing so, he helped Hearts win the Scottish League Cup in 1962 and come within a goal of winning the 1964–65 Scottish Football League title, while gaining full international recognition for Scotland.

In 1966, however, his form plummeted and his goalscoring ceased and, amid rumours that he had been "tapped" up by another club, his departure from Tynecastle was widely anticipated. The surprise was that his destination wasn't boyhood favourites Rangers but their nemesis Celtic, for whom Jock Stein paid £30,000 to secure his services. He played a total of 248 matches for Hearts in all competitions, scoring 131 goals.

Celtic
Within six months of joining Celtic, Wallace was to attain Scottish footballing immortality, as one of the "Lisbon Lions", the famous team who won the European Cup in 1967. He was later part of the team that reached the 1970 European Cup Final but was defeated 2–1 by Feyenoord. He also won the league championship in each of the four seasons he was at the Glasgow club, plus the Scottish Cup in 1967, 1969 and 1971 and the League Cup in 1968 and 1968 during an era widely considered the greatest in the club's history. In total, he scored 140 goals for Celtic in 239 games.

Later career
After five fruitful years with Celtic, Wallace and team-mate John Hughes were sold to Crystal Palace in October 1971 for a combined fee of £30,000. Neither enjoyed great success in Croydon and Wallace was back in Scotland with Dumbarton less than a year later. As his career wound down, he moved to Australia in March 1975 to play for APIA, where he won two league titles before returning to Scotland in March 1977, first to Partick Thistle for a week, before becoming player-coach at Ross County for the rest of the 1976–77 season.

International career
In total, Wallace was capped seven times for Scotland and four times for the Scottish Football League XI. He was part of the Scotland team that defeated England at Wembley in 1967.

Career after retirement
Retiring as a player in June 1977, he joined the coaching staff at Dundee. When this role ended he returned to APIA as a coach, eventually settling in Sydney and starting his own sports shop.

In 2008, Tommy Burns, a former Celtic player and manager, died; Wallace helped organise a tribute match played on 31 May 2009 at Celtic Park, attended by over 35,000 people. The Celtic squad of the time defeated the 'Tommy Burns Select' team 11–4. In July of the same year, Wallace arranged a friendly match in Australia (where he had lived for the past 30 years) between Celtic and the local professional club Brisbane Roar; Celtic won 3–0.

Career statistics

International appearances

See also
List of footballers in Scotland by number of league appearances (500+)
List of footballers in Scotland by number of league goals (200+)

References

Sources
 

1940 births
APIA Leichhardt FC players
Association football inside forwards
Celtic F.C. players
Crystal Palace F.C. players
Dumbarton F.C. players
Dundee F.C. non-playing staff
Expatriate soccer players in Australia
Heart of Midlothian F.C. players
Kilsyth Rangers F.C. players
Living people
Partick Thistle F.C. players
Raith Rovers F.C. players
Ross County F.C. players
Scotland international footballers
Scottish expatriate footballers
Scottish Football League players
Scottish Football League representative players
Scottish footballers
Sportspeople from Kirkintilloch
Stenhousemuir F.C. players
English Football League players
Scottish Football Hall of Fame inductees
UEFA Champions League winning players
Scottish expatriate sportspeople in Australia
Highland Football League players
Scottish Junior Football Association players
Outfield association footballers who played in goal
Scottish emigrants to Australia